The following inequality is known as Sedrakyan's inequality,   Bergström's inequality, Engel's form or Titu's lemma, respectively, referring to the article About the applications of one useful inequality of Nairi Sedrakyan published in 1997, to the book Problem-solving strategies of Arthur Engel published in 1998 and to the book Mathematical Olympiad Treasures of Titu Andreescu published in 2003.
It is a direct consequence of Cauchy–Bunyakovsky–Schwarz inequality. Nevertheless, in his article (1997) Sedrakyan has noticed that written in this form this inequality can be used as a mathematical proof technique and it has very useful new applications. In the book Algebraic Inequalities (Sedrakyan) are provided several generalizations of this inequality.

Statement of the inequality 
For any reals  and positive reals  we have  (Nairi Sedrakyan (1997), Arthur Engel (1998), Titu Andreescu (2003))

Probabilistic statement 
Similarly to the Cauchy–Schwarz inequality, one can generalize Sedrakyan's inequality to random variable.
In this formulation let  be a real random variable, and let  be a positive random variable.
Then

Direct applications 
Example 1. Nesbitt's inequality.

For positive real numbers 

Example 2. International Mathematical Olympiad (IMO) 1995.

For positive real numbers , where  we have that 

Example 3.

For positive real numbers  we have that 

Example 4.

For positive real numbers  we have that

Proofs 

Example 1.

Example 2.

We have that 

Example 3.

We have  so that 

Example 4.

We have that

References

Inequalities
Linear algebra
Operator theory
Articles containing proofs
Mathematical analysis
Probabilistic inequalities